A debutante ball, sometimes called a coming-out party, is a formal ball that includes presenting debutantes during the season, usually during the spring or summer. Debutante balls may require prior instruction in social etiquette and appropriate morals. The dress code is white tie and tails for men, and strictly floor-length pure white ball gown for women. Long white gloves are commonly worn by female debutantes and are considered a symbol of upper-class femininity.

In the United Kingdom, the tradition with debutantes ceremoniously presented at the British royal court during Queen Charlotte's Ball was discontinued by Queen Elizabeth II in 1958. The ball was revived in the 2000s under the patronage of the Duke of Somerset. In the contemporary United States, they are sometimes known as debutante cotillion balls and are held for middle schoolers as a chance to teach manners. In Brazil, this practice has disappeared in almost every city with the exception of Porto Alegre (capital of Rio Grande do Sul, the most southern state of Brazil). In Porto Alegre 40 to 90 girls from the richest families participate in a debutante ball per year, with some girls participating in more than one debutante ball.

See also
 Cotillion
 List of debutante balls in the United States
 International Debutante Ball
 Vienna Opera Ball

References 

American culture